In tennis, the sixth edition of the US Open Series (known as Olympus US Open Series for sponsorship reasons), included ten hard court tournaments started on July 20 in Indianapolis and ended in New Haven, Connecticut on August 29. This edition has scheduled five separate men's tournaments, four women's tournaments, and the Pilot Pen Tennis Tournament hosted both a men's and women's event. The series included two ATP World Tour Masters 1000 and two WTA Premier 5 events to headline the series.

Point distribution for series events 

To be included in the standings and subsequently the bonus prize money, a player had to have countable results from two different tournaments. Players finishing in the top three in the series can earn up to $1 million in extra prize money at the US Open. Roger Federer received the largest US Open pay day of $2.4 million in 2007 after capturing the title in both the US Open Series and the US Open championship.

US Open Series standings

ATP

Olympus US Open Series standings as of August 30, 2009.

Notes
1 - Tours - Number of tournaments in US Open Series in which a player has reached the quarterfinals or better, in 250 and 500 series events or the Round of 16 in ATP World Tour Masters 1000 events

WTA

Olympus US Open Series standings as of August 24, 2009.

Notes
1 - Tours - Number of tournaments in US Open Series in which a player has reached the quarterfinals or better, in Premier events; or the Round of 16 or better in Premier 5 events
2 - Pennetta finished second in the final standings based on more match wins in US Open Series Events.

2009 schedule

Week 1

ATP - Indianapolis Tennis Championships

Andy Roddick was scheduled to receive the number one seeding in this event, but pulled out due to a right hip flexor injury before the main draw was held. Instead 24th ranked Dmitry Tursunov, headlined the event. In the second round Sam Querrey avenged his final round loss at Newport with a straight sets win over fellow American Rajeev Ram. Canadian Frank Dancevic upset number one seeded Dmitry Tursunov to reach the semifinals where he was ousted by Sam Querrey in the semifinal in straight sets. Robby Ginepri neutralized the fast-serving 6'10" American John Isner to set up an All-American final on championship Sunday.

Main Draw Finals

Week 2

ATP - LA Tennis Open

On the day one all seeded players advanced, save Lu Yen-Hsun who lost in straight sets to Latvian Ernests Gulbis. After winning the first US Open Series title of the season, Robby Ginepri lost to former world No.1 Marat Safin in three sets. Indianapolis semifinalist John Isner and finalist Sam Querrey advanced to the second round after defeating Benjamin Becker and Denis Istomin, respectively.

Main Draw Finals

WTA - Bank of the West Classic

Main Draw Finals

Week 3

ATP - Legg Mason Tennis Classic

Main Draw Finals

WTA - LA Women's Tennis Championships

Main Draw Finals

Week 4

ATP - Rogers Masters

Main Draw Finals

WTA - Western & Southern Financial Group Women's Open

Main Draw Finals

Week 5

ATP - Western & Southern Financial Group Masters

Main Draw Finals

WTA - Rogers Cup

Main Draw Finals

Week 6

ATP - Pilot Pen Tennis

Main Draw Finals

WTA - Pilot Pen Tennis

Main Draw Finals

References

External links 
  Olympus US Open Series official website
 Indianapolis Tennis Championships - Official website
 LA Tennis Open - Official website
 LA Women's Tennis Championships - Official website
 Bank of the West Classic - Official website
 Legg Mason Tennis Classic - Official website
 Rogers Masters presented by National bank - Official website
 Western & Southern Financial Group Masters & Women's Open - Official website
 Rogers Cup - Official website
 Pilot Pen Tennis - Official website
 The official website of the 2009 US Open 

 
US Open Series
US Open Series